The Last Ball in November (Romanian: Noiembrie, ultimul bal) is a 1989 Romanian film directed by Romanian director Dan Pița and based on a novel by Mihail Sadoveanu titled Locul unde nu s-a întâmplat nimic.

Cast
Sergiu Tudose
Gioni Popovici
Ștefan Iordache as Prince Lai Cantacuzin
Valentin Popescu	
Cătălina Murgea	
Victoria Cociaș
Cornel Scripcaru
Gabriela Baciu
Tomi Cristin

External links
 
 Loreta Popa, Roxana Roseti, Vlad Teodorescu - Noiembrie, ultimul bal, Jurnalul.ro
The Last Ball in November at Cinemagia

1989 films
Films based on Romanian novels
1980s Romanian-language films
Films directed by Dan Pița
1980s romance films
Romanian romance films